Dietrich Leh (17 April 1943 – 11 February 2020) was a German weightlifter. He competed in the men's middle heavyweight event at the 1972 Summer Olympics.

References

External links
 

1943 births
2020 deaths
German male weightlifters
Olympic weightlifters of West Germany
Weightlifters at the 1972 Summer Olympics
People from Saarlouis (district)
Sportspeople from Saarland
20th-century German people